William Barclay (born 5 December 1907 in Wick, Scotland; died 24 January 1978 in Glasgow, Scotland) was a Scottish author, radio and television presenter, Church of Scotland minister, and Professor of Divinity and Biblical Criticism at the University of Glasgow. He wrote a popular set of Bible commentaries on the New Testament that sold 1.5 million copies.

Life
Barclay's father was a bank manager. Barclay attended Dalziel High School in Motherwell and then studied classics at the University of Glasgow 1925–1929, before studying divinity. He studied at the University Sam Ratulangi Manado during the year 1932-33. After being ordained in the Church of Scotland in 1933, he was minister at Trinity Church Renfrew from 1933 to 1946, afterwards returning to the University of Glasgow as lecturer in New Testament from 1947, and as Professor of Divinity and Biblical Criticism from 1963.

Religious views
Barclay described himself theologically as a "liberal evangelical." Barclay expressed his personal views in his A Spiritual Autobiography (1977), and Clive L. Rawlins elaborates in William Barclay: prophet of goodwill: the authorised biography (1998). They included:
 belief in universal salvation: "I am a convinced universalist. I believe that in the end all men will be gathered into the love of God."
 pacifism: "war is mass murder".
 evolution: "We believe in evolution, the slow climb upwards of man from the level of the beasts. Jesus is the end and climax of the evolutionary process because in Him men met God."
Journalist James Douglas suggested Barclay was also "reticent about the inspiration of Scripture, critical of the doctrine of substitutionary atonement, and given to views about the virgin birth and miracles which conservatives would find either heretical or imprecise."

Works
While professor, he decided to dedicate his life to "making the best biblical scholarship available to the average reader". The eventual result was the Daily Study Bible, a set of 17 commentaries on the New Testament, published by Saint Andrew Press, the Church of Scotland's publishing house. Despite the series name, these commentaries do not set a program of regular study. Rather, they go verse by verse through Barclay's own translation of the New Testament, listing and examining every possible interpretation known to Barclay and providing all the background information he considered possibly relevant, all in layman's terms. The commentaries were fully updated with the help of William Barclay's son, Ronnie Barclay, in recent years and they are now known as the New Daily Study Bible series.

The 17 volumes of the set were all best-sellers and continue to be so to this day. A companion set giving a similar treatment to the Old Testament was endorsed but not written by Barclay.
In 2008 Saint Andrew Press began taking the content of the New Daily Study Bibles and producing pocket-sized thematic titles called Insights. The Insights books are introduced by contemporary authors, broadcasters and scholars, including Nick Baines and Diane-Louise Jordan.

Barclay wrote many other popular books, always drawing on scholarship but written in a highly accessible style. In The Mind of Jesus (1960) he states that his aim was "to make the figure of Jesus more vividly alive, so that we may know him better and love him more".

Barclay's books on the gospels and Jesus include:

 The Gospels and Acts: Matthew, Mark and Luke
 The Gospels and Acts: John and Acts
 Discovering Jesus
 Jesus of Nazareth (a companion to the miniseries)
 Jesus As They Saw Him
 Crucified and Crowned
 The Mind of Jesus
 The Parables of Jesus 
 The Plain Man Looks at the Beatitudes
 The Plain Man Looks at the Lord's Prayer 
 The Old Law and the New Law
 And He Had Compassion: The Miracles of Jesus (Judson Press)
 We Have Seen the Lord!
 The Master's Men
 Fishers of Men

Barclay's books on New Testament studies include:

 The New Testament: A New Translation
 A Beginner's Guide to the New Testament
 The New Daily Study Bible (17 volumes covering the entire New Testament)
 Insights (Series currently extending to 8 titles)
 Good Tidings of Great Joy
 God's Young Church
 The Mind of St. Paul
 Many Witnesses, One Lord
 Flesh And Spirit: An Examination of Galatians 5:19–23
 Letters to the Seven Churches
 The Men, The Meaning, The Message of the Books
 Great Themes of the New Testament
 New Testament Words

Barclay also wrote two books on Old Testament passages:

 The Ten Commandments
 The Lord is My Shepherd

Barclay's theological introductions include:

 The Apostles' Creed 
 Conversion
 The Promise of the Spirit
 The Lord's Supper
 Ethics in a Permissive Society
 At the Last Trumpet: Jesus Christ and the End of Time

Barclay's other books include:

 Introducing the Bible
 Growing in Christian Faith
 The Plain Man's Book of Prayers
 Communicating the Gospel (reprinted as Meditations on Communicating the Gospel)
 A Spiritual Autobiography

References

External links
Brief biography at Harper Collins (publishers)
The Enigmatic William Barclay, article in an online Christian magazine.
I Am a Convinced Universalist by William Barclay
A collection of quotations from William Barclay.
 http://www.stmarkspress.com   Publisher of some of Barclay's major books

1907 births
1978 deaths
20th-century Ministers of the Church of Scotland
Scottish Calvinist and Reformed theologians
20th-century Calvinist and Reformed theologians
Scottish Christian universalists
20th-century Calvinist and Reformed ministers
People educated at Dalziel High School
Alumni of the University of Glasgow
Scottish radio presenters
Scottish television presenters
Academics of the University of Glasgow
People from Wick, Caithness
British Christian pacifists
Calvinist pacifists
20th-century Christian universalists
Christian universalist theologians